Dr. B. Mario Pinto is a Canadian chemical biologist, academic and the former President of the Natural Sciences and Engineering Research Council of Canada (NSERC). Prior to his appointment at NSERC, Pinto served as a chemistry professor and as the Vice-President of Research at Simon Fraser University. He is a fellow of the Royal Society of Canada, Chemical Institute of Canada and the American Chemical Society.

He resigned as president of NSERC on September 21, 2018.

He was appointed Deputy Vice Chancellor (Research) of Griffith University, Brisbane, Australia, on October 3, 2019, to commence in February 2020.

Education
Pinto received his undergraduate degree and doctorate from Queen's University in Ontario. He completed his post-doctoral work at the Centre national de la recherche scientifique in France and the National Research Council of Canada in Ottawa. Pinto has published over 225 papers.

Awards and honours
 Horace S. Isbell Award from the American Chemical Society in 1992
 CSC Bernard Belleau Award in 2002
 Elected to the Academy of Sciences of the Royal Society of Canada in 2003
 R.U. Lemieux Award in 2012
 Alfred Bader Award in 2013
 Montreal Medal in 2014 awarded for his "outstanding contribution to the profession of chemistry or chemical engineering in Canada."

References

External links
 News.gc.ca
 Finance.yahoo.com

 

Year of birth missing (living people)
Living people
Canadian biologists
Academic staff of Simon Fraser University
Queen's University at Kingston alumni